Kandha may refer to:
 Khonds, an ethnic group of India
 Kandha, Iran, a village in Iran

See also
 Khanda (disambiguation)